Sven Müller (born 4 April 1980) is a German former professional footballer who played as a defender or midfielder.

Club career
Müller was born in Burgau, West Germany. As a youth he played for his hometown team TSV Burgau before joining TSG Thannhausen and later the youth of TSV 1860 Munich. From 1998 to 2000 he played for FC Augsburg at amateur level before joining the Bundesliga member VfL Wolfsburg.

In January 2004, he changed clubs and went to 1. FC Nürnberg one league below but returned with them the same year to the highest German football league. The following year he had a place in the first eleven but after his former Wolfsburg manager Wolfgang Wolf left the club he did not play anymore so he followed him to famous 2. Bundesliga club 1. FC Kaiserslautern where he could return to his old strength. He moved to FC Erzgebirge Aue on 20 January 2009.

International career
Müller played five times for the Germany U-21 in 2000 and 2001.

Honours
1. FC Nürnberg
 Bundesliga promotion: 2003–04

References

External links
 
 
 

1980 births
Living people
FC Augsburg players
1. FC Kaiserslautern players
1. FC Nürnberg players
VfL Wolfsburg players
FC Erzgebirge Aue players
FSV Frankfurt players
Bundesliga players
2. Bundesliga players
Germany B international footballers
Germany under-21 international footballers
3. Liga players
Association football defenders
Association football midfielders
German footballers